Terrible twos may refer to:

 A child development stage which normally occurs around the age of two; see 
 The Terrible Twos, an American children's music band
 A 1982 novel by Ishmael Reed
 A book by Sarah Kennedy

See also
 The Terrible Two, a 2018 American film written and directed by Billy Lewis